Sex Doll is a 2016 drama thriller film, directed by Sylvie Verheyde, and produced by Bruno Berthemy, Bertrand Faivre, and Soledad Gatti-Pascual. The film stars Hafsia Herzi, Ash Stymest, and Karole Rocher in the lead roles.

Plot 

Rupert (Ash Stymest) struggles to rescue Virginie (Hafsia Herzi) from a French escort. Virginie lives a double life, pretending to be a real estate agent with her family and an escort in reality.  Rupert befriends her but has an agenda of his own. He is hired by family members of minors who are recruited by Virginie's boss. At an escort session wrong, Virginie's young colleague gets clobbered by the clients. Virginie rescues her, and Rupert helps them escape.  Unfortunately,  the relationship between Virginie and her boss sours. Virginie leaves, we see Rupert join her on the train.

Cast 

 Hafsia Herzi as Virginie
 Ash Stymest as Rupert
 Karole Rocher as Raphäelle
 Paul Hamy as Cook
 Marlon Blue as Nat

Reception

Critical response 
On the review aggregator Rotten Tomatoes, the film holds an approval rating of  based on  reviews. Metacritic, which uses a weighted average, assigned the film a score of 44 out of 100, based on 4 critics, indicating "Mixed or average reviews".

Frank Scheck of The Hollywood Reporter wrote, "A high-rent prostitute becomes romantically involved with a man harboring a secret in Sylvie Verheyde's erotic thriller."Decider wrote, "Writer/Director Sylvie Verheyde‘s Sex Doll is neither sexy, nor dolly (whatever that means)." Gary Goldstein of The Los Angeles Times wrote, "Tighter pacing, more dimensional and compelling characters, and twistier consequences could have helped better propel this dark, semi-intriguing tale."

References

External links 
 
 
 
 

2016 films
Films about prostitution in France
British multilingual films
French multilingual films
2010s French-language films
2016 multilingual films
2010s English-language films
Films directed by Sylvie Verheyde